The 2022 Northwest Territories Men's Curling Championship, the men's territorial curling championship for the Northwest Territories, was held from February 9 to 13 at the Yellowknife Curling Centre in Yellowknife, Northwest Territories. The winning Jamie Koe rink represented the Northwest Territories at the 2022 Tim Hortons Brier in Lethbridge, Alberta.

Teams played a double round robin, followed by a page playoff involving all four teams.

Teams
The teams are listed as follows:

Round-robin standings
Final round-robin standings

Round-robin results
All draw times are listed in Mountain Standard Time (UTC−07:00).

Draw 1
Wednesday, February 9, 2:30 pm

Draw 2
Wednesday, February 10, 9:00 am

Draw 3
Thursday, February 10, 2:30 pm

Draw 4
Friday, February 11, 9:00 am

Draw 5
Friday, February 11, 2:30 pm

Draw 6
Saturday, February 12, 11:00 am

Playoffs

1 vs. 2
Saturday, February 12, 4:30 pm

3 vs. 4
Saturday, February 12, 4:30 pm

Semifinal
Sunday, February 13, 11:00 am

Final
Sunday, February 13, 4:30 pm

References

Northwest Territories
Curling in the Northwest Territories
February 2022 sports events in Canada
2022 in the Northwest Territories
Sport in Yellowknife